David Lefèvre may refer to:
 David Lefèvre (cyclist)
 David Lefèvre (serial killer)